Châteauguay—Huntingdon—Laprairie was a federal electoral district in Quebec, Canada, that was represented in the House of Commons of Canada from 1949 to 1968.

History

This riding was created in 1947, from parts of Beauharnois—Laprairie and Châteauguay—Huntingdon ridings.

It consisted of:
 the county of Châteauguay, except the municipality of St-Joachim-de-Châteauguay;
 the county of Huntingdon, (except the municipalities of St. Anicet and Ste. Barbe), and the town of Huntingdon;
 the county of Laprairie (except the municipality of St-Jacques-le-Mineur), and the town of Laprairie; and
 in the county of St. Jean, the municipalities of Notre-Dame-du-Mont-Carmel, St-Bernard-de-Lacolle and the village of Lacolle.

It was abolished in 1966, when it was redistributed into Beauharnois, Chambly, Laprairie and Saint-Jean ridings.

Members of Parliament

This riding elected the following Members of Parliament:

Election results

See also 

 List of Canadian federal electoral districts
 Past Canadian electoral districts

External links
Riding history from the Library of Parliament

Former federal electoral districts of Quebec